Mayfield is an unincorporated community in Hancock County, Georgia, United States on the outskirts of its primary city Sparta.

History
Mayfield was named after the estate of a local judge.

The Shivers-Simpson House, also known as "Rock Mill", south of Mayfield along Mayfield Rd., is listed on the National Register of Historic Places.

References

Populated places established in 1970
Unincorporated communities in Georgia (U.S. state)
Unincorporated communities in Hancock County, Georgia